Desmond Stanley Webb (10 September 1934 – 24 March 1987) was a New Zealand rugby union player. A hooker, Webb represented Auckland and North Auckland at a provincial level. He played just one match for the New Zealand national side, the All Blacks, a test against the touring British Lions in 1959.

References

1934 births
1987 deaths
People from Kawakawa, New Zealand
People educated at Gisborne Boys' High School
University of Auckland alumni
New Zealand rugby union players
New Zealand international rugby union players
Auckland rugby union players
Northland rugby union players
Rugby union hookers
Rugby union players from the Northland Region